John Taylor Dismukes is an artist, whose work has appeared in a variety of media.

Biography
John Taylor Dismukes began his career as an illustrator in the city of Hollywood, California. Dismukes had established the JTD & Associates company in the year of 1985. The company was established when computer technology was beginning to take over the industry.

Education
John Taylor Dismukes received his education of art through the institution known as the Art Center College of Design, which is located in Pasadena, California.

Works
His paintings have been used as record album covers, film posters, and graphic novel covers.  His work also includes 2D and 3D computer illustration.

Album covers for:
 Y&T
 The Right to Rock
 Foreigner
 The Grateful Dead
 Steppenwolf

Posters:
 Charlotte's Web
 Mad Max Beyond Thunderdome
 Star Trek
 Star Wars
 Boba Fett lithograph (1998)
 Stormtroopers under the door lithograph (1998)
 3-panel vehicles lithograph (1999)
 The Addams Family

Comic covers:
 Insider (May 1992 cover)
 The Terminator: Hunters and Killers (all three issues)

Logos:
 ET The Lost World: Jurassic Park Megadeth – Countdown to Extinction & Exposure of a Dream''

References

External links
 John Taylor Dismukes • Illustration and Design Inc.

Living people
20th-century American painters
American male painters
21st-century American painters
21st-century American male artists
Year of birth missing (living people)
20th-century American male artists